Declana griseata is a species of moth in the family Geometridae. It is endemic to New Zealand.  This species is classified as "At Risk, Declining" by the Department of Conservation.

Taxonomy
Declana griseata was first described and illustrated by George Vernon Hudson in 1898. Hudson further discussed and illustrated the species both in his 1928 and 1939 publications. The  lectotype specimen is held at the Museum of New Zealand Te Papa Tongarewa.

Description
Hudson gave a description and illustration of the larvae of this species in his 1939 publication. In appearance the larvae are extremely variable but it is able to mimic the appearance of a twig on its host plant.

The pupa are enclosed in a cocoon made of moss and plant detritus and can be found on the ground.

Hudson described the adult moth as follows:

Distribution
Declana griseata is endemic to New Zealand. This species range is from the Bay of Plenty/Taupo to Southland. However it is likely locally extinct in some North Island localities. D. griseata has been recorded as being collected in Wellington, Top house at Lake Rotoiti, Mount Hutt, Castle Hill, Cave Creek in Paparoa National Park, Arthurs Pass, Waiho Gorge in Westland, Dunedin, Ben Lomond,  Lake Wakatipu, Takitimu Mountains in Southland, Invercargill and Orepuki.

Biology and behaviour 
The larvae of D. griseata are present in December and January. The adult moths emerge from February. This species can be found on the wing from September until May and is attracted to light. Adults rest on mossy tree trunks in the vicinity of their host plants.

Host species 
The host species of this moth are leafy mistletoes, including Peraxilla colensoi.

Conservation status
This moth is classified under the New Zealand Threat Classification system as being "At Risk, Declining". It was regarded by Hudson as being a scarce species even when first described. The survival of this moth is dependent on the survival of its host plants.

References

External links

Image of lectotype specimen

Moths of New Zealand
Moths described in 1898
Endemic fauna of New Zealand
Ennominae
Taxa named by George Hudson
Endangered biota of New Zealand
Endemic moths of New Zealand